The final of the Women's 800 metres Freestyle event at the European LC Championships 1997 was held on Saturday 1997-08-23 in Seville, Spain.

Finals

Qualifying heats

See also
1996 Women's Olympic Games 800m Freestyle
1997 Women's World Championships (SC) 800m Freestyle

References
 scmsom results

F